Paul Olfelt House is a Usonian style house designed by Frank Lloyd Wright in St. Louis Park, Minnesota, at the outskirts of Minneapolis. It was designed in 1958 and completed in 1960 as a residence for Paul and Helen Olfelt, who commissioned both the building and the interior design from the architect.

In 2017 the house was put up for sale for $1,395,000.00

References 

 Storrer, William Allin. The Frank Lloyd Wright Companion. University Of Chicago Press, 2006,  (S.427)

1960 establishments in Minnesota
Frank Lloyd Wright buildings
Houses completed in 1960
Houses in Hennepin County, Minnesota
Modernist architecture in Minnesota